Giuliana Spada (born 18 April 1971) is an Italian female retired heptathlete, which participated at the 1993 World Championships in Athletics.

Personal best
Heptathlon: 6135 pts,  Cesano Maderno, 28 May 1995

Achievements

See also
Italian all-time top lists - Heptathlon

References

External links
 

1971 births
Italian female pentathletes
Italian heptathletes
World Athletics Championships athletes for Italy
Athletes (track and field) at the 1996 Summer Olympics
Olympic athletes of Italy
Living people
20th-century Italian women